Moʻo are shapeshifting lizard spirits in Hawaiian mythology.

Description

Moʻo often take the forms of monstrous reptiles, tiny geckos, and humans. They were revered as ʻaumakua, and could have power over the weather and water. They are amphibious, and many fishponds in Hawaii were believed to be home to a moʻo. When a moʻo dies, its petrified body becomes part of the landscape.

List of Moʻo

Mamala: A moʻo known for her skill in surfing.
Kalamainuʻu: A moʻo associated with wrasse fishing.
Kapulei: A male moʻo whose body is said to lie on Kamalō Ridge.
Kihawahine: A moʻo believed to inhabit Mokuhinia and Violet Lake.
Hauwahine: The moʻo guardian of Kawainui
Several named moʻo were defeated by Hiʻiaka

References 

Hawaiian legendary creatures
Legendary reptiles
Shapeshifting
Water spirits